Ilchev Buttress (‘Ilchev Rid’ \'il-chev 'rid\) is the rocky, partly ice-covered buttress extending 5 km in north-south direction, 2.2 km wide and 1374 m high, forming the northeast extremity of Chiren Heights on Velingrad Peninsula, Graham Coast in Graham Land, Antarctica.  It has steep and partly ice-free west, north and east slopes, and surmounts Sohm Glacier to the west, Bilgeri Glacier to the northwest, Byaga Point and Barilari Bay to the northeast, and Weir Glacier to the southeast.

The buttress is named after Ivan Ilchev, rector of Sofia University (2007–2015), for his support for the Bulgarian Antarctic programme.

Location
British mapping in 1976.

Maps
 Antarctic Digital Database (ADD). Scale 1:250000 topographic map of Antarctica. Scientific Committee on Antarctic Research (SCAR). Since 1993, regularly upgraded and updated.
British Antarctic Territory. Scale 1:200000 topographic map. DOS 610 Series, Sheet W 66 64. Directorate of Overseas Surveys, Tolworth, UK, 1976.

Notes

References
 Bulgarian Antarctic Gazetteer. Antarctic Place-names Commission. (details in Bulgarian, basic data in English)
 Ilchev Buttress. SCAR Composite Antarctic Gazetteer.

External links
 Ilchev Buttress. Copernix satellite image

Ridges of Graham Land
Bulgaria and the Antarctic
Graham Coast